Mary Ellen Barbera (born September 10, 1951) is an American lawyer and jurist from Baltimore, Maryland.

Education 
In 1975, Barbera earned a bachelor's degree from Towson State College. In 1984, Barbera earned a JD degree from University of Maryland School of Law.

Career 
From July 8, 2013 to September 10, 2021, she served as Chief Judge on the Maryland Court of Appeals, the highest court in the state. Until 2008, she served as a judge on the Court of Appeals representing the 7th Appellate Judicial Circuit (Montgomery County). Barbera, a graduate of the University of Maryland School of Law, is the first female Chief Judge of the Maryland Court of Appeals.

Prior to her appointment to the Court of Appeals, she served as an at large judge on Maryland's intermediate appellate court, the Court of Special Appeals, from January 4, 2002 to September 2, 2008. On July 3, 2013, Governor Martin O'Malley appointed Judge Barbera as successor to former Chief Judge Robert M. Bell, who reached the mandatory retirement age of 70. On September 3, 2021, Governor Larry Hogan appointed Judge Joseph M. Getty to succeed Barbera when she reached the mandatory retirement age on September 10, 2021.

See also
List of female state supreme court justices

References

External links
 
 Barbera's profile at the Maryland State Archives

1951 births
21st-century American judges
21st-century American women judges
Chief Judges of the Maryland Court of Appeals
Lawyers from Baltimore
Living people
Towson University alumni
University of Maryland Francis King Carey School of Law alumni
Women chief justices of state supreme courts in the United States